Southport is an excluded city in Marion County, Indiana, United States. The population was 1,712 at the 2010 census.

History
The area that is now known as Southport was a wooded area until the first European American settlers arrived in the 1820s. Early settlers included Jacob Smock and Randall Litzey in 1822, Samuel Brewer in 1823, Benjamin McFarland in 1826, and Samuel and Mary Bryan in 1828.  Mary Bryan is remembered as one of the first European American women to cross the Cumberland Mountains.  By 1828 Southport was a stagecoach stop on the Madison-Indianapolis road.  Southport claims it was founded in 1832. The town was platted in 1852.

In 1847 the Jeffersonville, Madison and Indianapolis Railroad was opened through Southport, increasing traffic to and through the town, and bringing increased development.  By 1884 the population reached 388.  By 1960 it was 892.  As of the 2010 census, Southport has a population of 1,712. Southport contained a post office until 1960.

Geography
Southport is located at  (39.661259, -86.118515).

Demographics

2010 census
As of the census of 2010, there were 1,712 people, 696 households, and 484 families living in the city. The racial makeup of the city was 94.1% White, 1.8% African American, 0.1% Native American, 1.1% Asian, 1.8% from other races, and 1.2% from two or more races. Hispanic or Latino of any race were 3.4% of the population.

There were 696 households, of which 30.0% had children under the age of 18 living with them, 51.3% were married couples living together, 12.9% had a female householder with no husband present, 5.3% had a male householder with no wife present, and 30.5% were non-families. 24.0% of all households were made up of individuals, and 10.4% had someone living alone who was 65 years of age or older. The average household size was 2.46 and the average family size was 2.89.

The median age in the city was 41.3 years. 22.1% of residents were under the age of 18; 7.8% were between the ages of 18 and 24; 24.4% were from 25 to 44; 29.9% were from 45 to 64; and 15.7% were 65 years of age or older. The gender makeup of the city was 48.1% male and 51.9% female.

2000 census
As of the census of 2000, there were 1,852 people, 733 households, and 521 families living in the city. The racial makeup of the city was 96.54% White, 0.38% African American, 0.11% Native American, 0.86% Asian, 1.30% from other races, and 0.81% from two or more races. Hispanic or Latino of any race were 2.38% of the population.

There were 733 households, out of which 32.3% had children under the age of 18 living with them, 56.9% were married couples living together, 10.2% had a female householder with no husband present, and 28.8% were non-families. 23.9% of all households were made up of individuals, and 8.0% had someone living alone who was 65 years of age or older. The average household size was 2.53 and the average family size was 2.97.

In the city, the population was spread out, with 24.4% under the age of 18, 7.4% from 18 to 24, 29.8% from 25 to 44, 26.0% from 45 to 64, and 12.4% who were 65 years of age or older. The median age was 39 years. For every 100 females, there were 97.0 males. For every 100 females age 18 and over, there were 94.7 males.

The median income for a household in the city was $56,719, and the median income for a family was $59,926. Males had a median income of $48,295 versus $28,125 for females. The per capita income for the city was $24,374. About 4.3% of families and 6.2% of the population were below the poverty line, including 7.2% of those under age 18 and 3.6% of those age 65 or over.

Education
Southport is in the Metropolitan School District of Perry Township, whose Southport Elementary is within the city boundaries. The Southport branch of the Indianapolis Public Library, while not actually in Southport, lies immediately west of the city's boundary on Stop 11 Road.

See also
Long's Bakery

References

External links

City website

Cities in Indiana
Cities in Marion County, Indiana
Indianapolis metropolitan area